Paul Fireman (born February 14, 1944) is an American businessman, who for 26 years led Reebok International, Ltd. as chairman and CEO. Fireman sold Reebok to Adidas in 2005.

Early life and education
Fireman was born February 14, 1944, in Cambridge, Massachusetts, to a Jewish family and raised in the working-class city of Brockton, Massachusetts, also called 'Shoe City'. He attended high school at Tabor Academy, a private secondary school in Marion, MA and matriculated to Boston University, but did not graduate.

Personal life

Fireman and his wife Phyllis (née Brenner) grew up in Brockton, Massachusetts and met at age 12 at a YMHA mixer. Fireman and his wife, Phyllis, are competitive bridge players. In 2014, his team won the Roth Open Swiss Teams at the Summer North American Bridge Championship (NABC) in Las Vegas and subsequently captured the bronze medal representing the U.S. in Chennai, India at the World Bridge Championships in 2015.

Career
Fireman began his career at age 18 working in the family business, Boston Camping, selling outdoor sporting goods and fishing tackle for 15 years.

While attending a sporting goods show in Chicago in 1979 Fireman met Joe Foster, the owner of an English running shoe company founded in 1895 called Reebok. Fireman acquired the North American sales rights to Reebok in 1979 and eventually bought the English-based parent company outright in 1984. Reebok capitalized on the increasing popularity of aerobics in California and introduced the world's first aerobic shoe designed specifically for women in 1982 called Freestyle. Riding the success of the Freestyle shoe as the aerobics craze swept across America, Fireman grew the company and Reebok issued an IPO in 1985. In 1988, Fireman  established the annual Reebok Human Rights Awards recognizing activists under the age of 30 who exposed and reduced human rights atrocities.

Fireman sold Reebok to Adidas in 2005 for $3.8 billion; Fireman himself made $800 million from the deal. He is currently the Chairman of Fireman Capital Partners, a Boston-based, consumer-focused private equity firm founded in 2008 with his son Dan, the firm's Managing Partner.

Golf course development

Fireman has been active in golf course development and in 1991 he purchased Willowbend Country Club (Mashpee, Massachusetts). The development of additional courses followed that included Rio Mar Resort and Country Club (Puerto Rico), Costa Caribe Golf and Country Club (Puerto Rico), Coco Beach Golf and Country Club (Puerto Rico), The Ranch Golf Club (Southwick, Massachusetts), and Starr Pass Club (Tucson, Arizona).

Fireman was one of the developers of Liberty National Golf Club (Jersey City, New Jersey), which is adjacent to Liberty State Park. The golf club is one of the most expensive ever built, costing a reported $250 million dollars. It site had formerly housed an ammunition depot during World War I, a prisoner of war camp during World War II, and later an oil refinery and warehouse for industrial goods, having become a “a toxic moonscape of corroded oil tanks, contaminated soil, and rusting warehouses” by 1999 (Forbes).
Although Fireman has publicly taken credit for paying to redevelop the "former toxic Superfund site", the cost of cleaning the land was at least in part paid with public funds. It is one of the most exclusive golf clubs in the world, with initial membership fees contemplated at $500,000 to $750,000 in 2004.

In 2017 Fireman spearheaded a push to expand the golf club by 3 holes by acquiring the Caven Point section of Liberty State Park, which is a migratory bird habitat, sparking a controversy amongst Jersey City community members and environmental activists. The attempted acquisition of Caven Point by private developers also inspired proposed legislation entitled The "Liberty State Park Protection Act", which would permanently protect much of the park from privatization.

Fireman reportedly responded to the public backlash with a strategy to begin "framing the park’s redevelopment as a 'fight for social justice,' just as the nation was roiled by the police killing of George Floyd". Fireman funded a social media push to oppose the public redevelopment plan, pushing the narrative that it was "excluding communities of color from decision-making and asking on its website, 'Do Black lives matter when it comes to Liberty State Park?'" 

The golf club also came under fire for collecting $751,452 from the Paycheck Protection Program, a relief fund for small businesses affected by the shutdown caused by the COVID-19 pandemic.

Since its opening in 2006, Liberty National has hosted three FedEx Cup playoff tournaments (The Barclays in 2009, 2013 and The Northern Trust in 2019, 2021) and the Presidents Cup in 2017. Liberty National also hosts junior golf tournaments (AJGA Polo Junior Classic 2019, 2021) and the First Tee of New Jersey.

Other activities
In 2010, Fireman placed his Winecup-Gamble Ranch up for sale for $50 million.

In 2014, Fireman proposed a $4.6 billion project on New Jersey's Gold Coast, which would include a 95-story tower with a casino and 100,000-seat motor sport stadium. The New Jersey Constitution does not allow casinos outside of Atlantic City. In 2016, Fireman was an important backer of Public Question 1, a ballot measure that would amend the constitution to allow casino gambling in North Jersey. After numerous polls showed that Question 1 had no chance to pass, Fireman, along with Jeff Gural, pulled their financial support for the measure. Bill Cortese, the leader of Trenton's Bad Bet, a group opposed to the question, said, "Trenton's Bad Bet will not be distracted by billionaire developers throwing temper tantrums because they don't get what they want."

Philanthropy and political contributions

The Paul and Phyllis Fireman Charitable Foundation was established in 1985.

Fireman is a supporter of The First Tee whose mission is to "impact the lives of young people by providing educational programs that build character, instill life-enhancing values and promote healthy habits through the game of golf."

Campaign contributions
Fireman donated $250,000 to Republican Mitt Romney's 2012 presidential campaign, but he has also donated to Democratic Senators Bob Menendez and Cory Booker and several other candidate and committees of both parties. Fireman donated $1 million to the 2016 presidential campaign of New Jersey Governor Chris Christie.

Awards

The Academy of Achievement's Golden Plate Award, 1987
Thurgood Marshall Corporate Leadership Award
Northeastern University Commencement Speaker and Honorary Degree, Doctor of Humanities, 1990
Babson College, Honorary Degree, LL.D. Doctor of Laws, 1994
Tabor Academy Lifetime Achievement Award, 2007
Suffolk University Commencement Speaker and Honorary Degree, Doctor of Commerce, 2013
Mannie Jackson Award, 2015
Sports Business Journal Lifetime Achievement Award, 2015

References

People from Massachusetts
Living people
American Jews
American billionaires
1944 births